Ambuno Achille (born 2 November 1987) is a Cameroonian footballer who currently plays for Saba Qom in Iran Pro League.

Club career

Rahian Kermanshah

Achille was part of Rahian Kermanshah's youth academy until 2012, when he was promoted to the first team squad by coach Javad Zarincheh. He played twenty games and scored five goals in his debut season for Rahian Kermanshah. At the next season, he was part of starting XI of Rahian Kermanshah, where he played twenty one games and scored ten goals.

Saba Qom
On 25 June 2014, Achille was signed by Saba Qom. He signed a contract until 2017 with the club and was given number 9 shirt. He played his first game for Saba in a 2–1 match against Zob Ahan where he scored the winning goal.

Career statistics

References

Living people
1987 births
Cameroonian footballers
Cameroonian expatriate footballers
Saba players
Expatriate footballers in Iran
Place of birth missing (living people)
Association football forwards